Whites Creek, formerly known as White's Creek, was once a natural waterway that was concreted to improve sanitation. The creek is now a heritagelisted artificial waterway located in the innerwest region of Sydney, New South Wales, Australia.

Course and features
Sanitation was poor in the first 100 years of the new colony, and the waterways were contaminated.  The waterway was concreted and became a Whites Creek Channel between 1898 and 1935, to cope with the runoff from the increasing amount of impermeable surfaces  that. The Whites Creek storm drain as it is now, is located in flows in a northerly direction into Rozelle Bay, part of the Sydney Harbour.

In 1898, an aqueduct was built to carry the sewerage over Whites Creek. This was the first use of the Monier system of reinforced concrete in Australia.

Wetlands were constructed adjacent to the Whites Creek Channel in 2002, to filter out excess nutrients and improve the quality of water flowing into the harbour.

Etymology
Whites Creek is named in honour of John White, the surgeon to the First Fleet. White received a land grant, which he named Hamond Hill Farm, to the south of Parramatta Road, where Whites Creek has its source.

Gallery

See also

Sydney Metropolitan catchment

References

External links

New South Wales State Heritage Register
Creeks and canals of Sydney
Inner West
Constructed wetlands in Australia